Lars-Erik Gustafsson (17 August 1938 – 26 December 2014) was a Swedish steeplechase runner. He competed in the men's 3000 metres steeplechase at the 1964 Summer Olympics.

References

1938 births
2014 deaths
Athletes (track and field) at the 1964 Summer Olympics
Swedish male steeplechase runners
Olympic athletes of Sweden
Place of birth missing